Pilosocereus floccosus is a species of plant in the family Cactaceae. It is endemic to Brazil, in Bahia and Minas Gerais states.  Its natural habitats are subtropical or tropical dry forests and rocky areas. It is threatened by habitat loss.

Subspecies
 Pilosocereus floccosus subsp. floccosus
 Pilosocereus floccosus subsp. quadricostatus

References

floccosus
Cacti of South America
Endemic flora of Brazil
Flora of Bahia
Flora of Minas Gerais
Near threatened flora of South America
Taxonomy articles created by Polbot